The men's 60 metres hurdles at the 2014 IAAF World Indoor Championships took place on 8–9 March 2014.

Records

Qualification standards

Schedule

Results

Heats
Qualification: First 3 in each heat (Q) and the next 4 fastest (q) qualified for the semifinal.

Semifinals
Qualification: First 4 in each heat (Q)   qualified for the final.

Final

References

60 metres Hurdles
60 metres hurdles at the World Athletics Indoor Championships